Jander is a name. It may refer to:

Given name
 Jander (footballer) (born 1988), Jander Ribeiro Santana, Brazilian football left-back

Surname
 Gerhart Jander (1892-1961), German inorganic chemist
 Gundula Jander (fl. 1965), German canoeist
 Georg Jander (fl. 1996-present), American botanist
 Caspar Jander (born 2003), German football midfielder